Ateş (Fire) is the eleventh studio album by Turkish singer Demet Akalın. It was released on 18 April 2019 by Doğan Music Company. The album was among Turkey's best-selling albums of 2019 and received a gold certification from DMC.

Background and design
Demet Akalın first announced her plans for releasing a new album during her concert at the Bostancı Show Center on 27 October 2018. Akalın's photographs for the album were taken by Erman İştahlı and its cover was designed by Ahmet Terzioğlu.

Promotion
To promote Ateş, Akalın organized a number of concerts in various cities across Turkey in summer 2019.

Music videos
Four of the songs in this album were turned into music videos. The lead single, "N'apıyorsan Yap", was released on 19 April 2019 together with a music video. The second music video was released for the song "Ağlar O Deli". It was directed by Nihat Odabaşı. Tamer Aydoğdu directed the music video for the album's third music video "Esiyor". Another music video, also directed by Aydoğdu, was released for the song "Yekten", which featured vocals by Haktan.

Critical reception
Mayk Şişman from Milliyet believed that "with her new songs, Demet Akalın has thrown us a curve", which he found pleasing and added: "For someone like Demet Akalın, who does not want to take risks, likes to go along the path created by her previous hit songs, and has her name associated with 'guaranteed' criticism, it's actually important to try a new 'sound'." Furkan Can Hazar from the same newspaper described Akalın as "a female vocal who directs the music market" and added that in this album he saw "Demet Akalın as a dynamic and lively artist who is open to innovation." Yavuz Hakan Tok, who wrote a review of the album on his personal website, found it not bad and wrote: "Won't it be listened to? Won't it be loved? It'll be listened to again, it'll be loved again, but as I said, the atmosphere of that time was different, now it's another era. Catching the atmosphere of every period is not an easy task. Not easy for Demet. Because from the beginning, Demet Akalın squeezed herself somewhere between pop and arabesque songs." Writing for Sabah, Özlem Avcı described Akalın as key "manufacturer in music industry" and praised her ability in "choosing songs suitable for her voice."

Track listing

Charts

Sales

Release history

Notes

References

2019 albums
Demet Akalın albums